Felix Kroos (born 12 March 1991) is a German former professional footballer who played as a midfielder. He played for Hansa Rostock, Werder Bremen, Union Berlin, and Eintracht Braunschweig and represented Germany at international levels U16 through U21. He is the younger brother of German International midfielder Toni Kroos.

Club career

Early career
Kroos began his career in 1997 at Greifswalder SC and was in summer 2002 scouted by Hansa Rostock. Kroos played for Hansa Rostock II for two seasons. Kroos made his professional debut in a third round German Cup match for Hansa Rostock against VfL Wolfsburg on 28 January 2009. He was substituted on in the 69th minute for Sebastian Svärd. Two days prior to the relegation of Hansa Rostock, Kroos announced his departure from the club.

Werder Bremen
Kroos signed a three-year contract for Werder Bremen on 15 June 2010. On 24 November 2010, he made his first-team debut during an away UEFA Champions League fixture against Tottenham Hotspur during which he gave away a penalty for a foul on Luka Modrić in a 3–0 loss. He finished the 2010–11 season with six matches played. He played in one match during the 2011–12. He made five appearances during the 2012–13 season. On 9 November 2013, he scored his first Bundesliga goal against Schalke 04 in an away match, which ended as a 3–1 defeat for Bremen. He finished the 2013–14 season with a goal in 20 matches played. He finished the 2014–15 season with 29 matches played. During the 2015–16 season, Kroos made nine appearances before moving to Union Berlin.

Union Berlin
Kroos was loaned out to Union Berlin on 28 January 2016. He joined the club permanently in June, reportedly for a transfer fee of €500,000 and a 20% share of a potential future transfer fee. He finished the 2015–16 season with two goals in 12 matches played for Union Berlin.

He scored his first goal for Union Berlin on 12 February 2017 in a 3–1 win over Arminia Bielefeld in the 2. Bundesliga, with a free kick. He finished the 2016–17 season with two goals in 31 matches played.

He finished the 2017–18 season with a goal in 30 matches played.

Eintracht Braunschweig
In September 2020, after his contract with Union Berlin expired, Kroos moved to 2. Bundesliga side Eintracht Braunschweig on a two-year contract.

Retirement
Kroos retired from playing in July 2021.

On 26 November 2021, Kroos was appointed assistant coach of Union Berlin's U-19 side.

International career
Kroos played Germany's youth national teams at levels U16 through U21.

Personal life
Kroos was born in Greifswald, Mecklenburg-Vorpommern. He is the younger brother of German international midfielder Toni Kroos.

Career statistics

Honours
Individual
2007: Talent of the Year in Mecklenburg-Vorpommern
Fritz Walter Medal: U18 Bronze Medal 2009

References

External links

Felix Kroos at spox.com 

1991 births
Living people
People from Greifswald
German footballers
Footballers from Mecklenburg-Western Pomerania
Association football midfielders
Germany youth international footballers
Germany under-21 international footballers
Bundesliga players
2. Bundesliga players
3. Liga players
Regionalliga players
Greifswalder SV 04 players
FC Hansa Rostock players
SV Werder Bremen players
SV Werder Bremen II players
1. FC Union Berlin players
Eintracht Braunschweig players